Mount Saint Joseph Hospital (MSJ) is a community acute-care hospital located in Vancouver, British Columbia. Like St. Paul's Hospital in downtown Vancouver, Mount Saint Joseph is operated by Providence Health Care, a Roman Catholic faith-based care provider.

In addition to acute care facilities, the hospital houses the Mount Saint Joseph Residence, a 100-bed long-term care facility.


History 
Founded in 1946, the hospital opened a new 50-bed wing in 1956.

Facilities 
The hospital offers numerous community healthcare services including:

 Emergency care
The hospital's emergency department is open daily from 8 am to 8 pm.
 Radiology

References 

Hospitals in British Columbia
Buildings and structures in Vancouver